Kessing is a surname. Notable people with the surname include:

Kaye Kessing (born 1950), Australian children's writer and  book illustrator
Oliver Kessing (1890–1963), American football executive
Kerrie C. Kessing (born 1969), American attorney at law whose practice has a strong focus in animal advocacy.